Feerick is a surname. Notable people with the surname include:

Bob Feerick (1920–1976), American basketball player
John Feerick (born 1936), American legal academic
Mike Feerick, Irish businessman

See also
Ferrick
Feyerick